Massachusetts Bay Community College (MassBay) is a public community college in Norfolk and Middlesex Counties. Founded in 1961, MassBay currently serves more than 4,400 full-time and part-time students on its three locations: Wellesley, Ashland, and Framingham. MassBay offers more than 70 degree and certificate programs aimed at helping students transfer to a four-year college or university or towards direct placement into a career. Massachusetts Bay Community College is accredited by the New England Commission of Higher Education.

History

Massachusetts Bay Community College was chartered in February 1961 by the Commonwealth of Massachusetts as one of the first community colleges in Massachusetts. MassBay opened with temporary campuses in Watertown, in a property leased from Raytheon Company, and Boston, and at the time served just several hundred students. In 1975, the college moved to its permanent location in Wellesley Hills, on the campus of the former Elizabeth Seton High School. In 1990, MassBay opened a second campus in Framingham, which currently houses its health sciences and human services programs. In 2001, MassBay opened its Automotive Technology Center in Ashland.

External links
Official website

References

1961 establishments in Massachusetts
Community colleges in Massachusetts
Educational institutions established in 1961
NJCAA athletics
Universities and colleges in Norfolk County, Massachusetts
Wellesley, Massachusetts